Pischelsdorf may refer to the following places in Austria:

Pischelsdorf am Engelbach, a municipality in Upper Austria
Pischelsdorf in der Steiermark, a municipality in Styria